Carol Namugenyi (born 27 September 1990) is a Ugandan cricketer. In July 2018, she was named in Uganda's squad for the 2018 ICC Women's World Twenty20 Qualifier tournament. She made her Women's Twenty20 International (WT20I) for Uganda against Scotland in the World Twenty20 Qualifier on 7 July 2018.

References

External links
 

1990 births
Living people
Ugandan women cricketers
Uganda women Twenty20 International cricketers
Place of birth missing (living people)